The culture of Paris concerns the arts, music, museums, festivals and other entertainment in Paris, the capital city of France. The city is today one of the world's leading business and cultural centers; entertainment, music, media, fashion, and the arts all contribute to its status as one of the world's major global cities.

Paris is also home to notable cultural attractions such as the Louvre, Musée Picasso, Musée Rodin, Musée du Montparnasse, and Musée National d'Art Moderne. The Musée d'Orsay and Musée de l'Orangerie are notable for housing Impressionist era masterpieces, while art and artifacts from the Middle Ages can be seen in Musée Cluny.

A variety of landmarks and objects are cultural icons associated with Paris, such as Eiffel Tower, Notre Dame de Paris and Opéra Garnier. Many of Paris' once-popular local establishments have come to cater to the tastes and expectations of tourists, rather than local patrons. Le Lido, the cabaret-dance hall, for example, is a staged dinner theater spectacle, a dance display that was once but one aspect of the cabaret's former atmosphere. All of the establishment's former social or cultural elements, such as its ballrooms and gardens, are gone today. Much of Paris' hotel, restaurant, and night entertainment trades have become heavily dependent on tourism.

Architecture

Haussmann's renovation of Paris during the mid-19th century created many of its wide boulevards and characteristic multi-level housing, often with shops and cafes at the ground level. The purpose of the renovations was to replace crowded, dilapidated Medieval-era housing, but some areas, such as the Marais, were untouched by the renovation of Paris. Other notable landmarks erected during the 19th century feature elaborate Art Nouveau designs popular during the Belle Epoque, such as the Palais Garnier (Paris Opera) and the Galeries Lafayette shopping center.

The city's cathedrals are another main attraction; its Notre Dame de Paris and the Basilique du Sacré-Coeur receive twelve  million and eight  million visitors, respectively.

The Eiffel Tower, by far Paris' most famous monument, averages over six  million visitors per year and more than 200  million since its construction.

Modern landmarks of Paris architecture include the Centre Georges Pompidou, which officially opened on 31 January 1977, and the Louvre Pyramid designed by I. M. Pei, completed in 1989.

Media

Print press

The regional daily edition of Le Parisien is available in ten departmental editions, of which one is Paris. There are four free daily newspapers distributed around Paris,  three in the morning (20 minutes, Direct Matin and Métro), and one free evening newspaper (Direct Soir), which are often read on public transportation.

Le Monde is based in Paris and provides coverage of major national and international news. Le Figaro is a conservative daily newspaper, while Libération is a liberal daily newspaper.

L'Officiel des spectacles and Pariscope offer in-depth coverage of the city's cultural events, including extensive listings in the Wednesday editions.

The large English-language newspaper of Paris is the International Herald Tribune. There is also a monthly publication, Irish Eyes, targeting the English-language community in Paris.

Web sites
Major Websites that provide news coverage and event reviews for Paris include the following:
www.parisvoice.com (Webzine for English-speaking Parisians)

Local television
Outside of regional programming and the national channel France 3, there are some local channels available. Télif (acronym for Télévision Île-de-France), offers the following local city channels by cable, ADSL or satellite:
VOTV (Val-d'Oise)
Télessonne (Essonne)
TVM Est parisien (Seine-Saint-Denis)
TVFil78 (Yvelines) 
RTV (Rosny-sous-Bois). 
Paris has seen attempts at "pirate television", through Zaléa TV (TéléviZone d'Action pour la Liberté d'Expression Audiovisuelle) an association of some Paris broadcasters, which disbanded in 2008. Teleplaisance.org, another cooperative broadcasting channel, offers only amateur programming. As of 2012, it offers programming over the internet.

The seven local TNT channels began broadcasting on 20 March 2008. They include NRJ Paris, IDF 1, and Cap 24. Four other broadcasters share the same channel: Demain IDF, " télévision de l'urbanité et de la diversité " (urban and diverse television); BDM TV, which goes into the neighborhoods to discuss culture and initiatives; Cinaps TV, a collective of scientists and artists whose objective is to create television programming about learning and to encourage curiosity. Finally, there is Télé Bocal, focusing on disadvantaged neighborhoods and urban politics.

Museums and galleries

Paris's museums and monuments are among its most highly esteemed attractions; tourism has motivated both the city and national governments to create new ones. The city's most prized museum, the Louvre, welcomes over 8  million visitors a year, being by far the world's most-visited art museum. It houses many works of art, including the Mona Lisa (La Joconde) and the Venus de Milo statue. Works by Pablo Picasso and Auguste Rodin is found in the Musée Picasso and the Musée Rodin, respectively, while the artistic community of Montparnasse, part of the School of Paris, is chronicled at the Musée Mendjisky.

Starkly apparent with its service-pipe exterior, the Centre Georges Pompidou, also known as the Beaubourg, houses the Musée National d'Art Moderne, and Impressionist and other eras are exhibited in the Musée d'Orsay and Musée de l'Orangerie. Art and artifacts from the Middle Ages are kept in the Musée national du Moyen Âge (former Musée de Cluny), including the prized tapestry cycle The Lady and the Unicorn. Paris' newest (and third-largest) museum, the Musée du Quai Branly, opened its doors in June 2006 and houses art from Africa, Asia, Oceania, and the Americas. Musée Cernuschi specializes in East Asian art, specifically focussed on the art of China, Japan, and Korea.

Museums with a particular focus on science or technology include the Muséum national de Histoire naturelle (National Museum of Natural History), the Musée des Arts et Métiers (Museum of Arts and Crafts), and the Observatoire de Paris (Paris Observatory). An extensive number of historical sites around Paris are now open to the public as museums, including the Hôtel des Invalides (Musée de l'Armée / Army Museum); Maison de Victor Hugo (Victor Hugo House), Maison de Balzac (Balzac House), the Catacombs of Paris, the Musée national de la Marine (National Navy Museum), and the former royal palace at Versailles, near the city. The Bourse de commerce was also repurposed as a contemporary art museum.

The city is also the home of dozens of smaller museums. Some unusual and notable museums include the Musée de la Chasse et de la Nature (Museum of Nature and Hunting), the Musée de la Contrefaçon (Museum of Counterfeiting), the Musée de la Magie (Museum of Magic) and the Musée de la Vie Romantique (Museum of Romanticism), which has exhibitions about the 19th-century Romantic movement.

Opera and theatres

Paris' largest opera houses are the nineteenth-century Opéra Garnier (historical Paris Opéra) and modern Opéra Bastille; the former tends towards the more classic ballets and operas, and the latter provides a mixed repertoire of classic and modern. In the middle of the 19th century, there were active two other competing opera houses: Opéra-Comique (which still exists to this day) and Théâtre Lyrique (which in modern times changed its profile and name to Théâtre de la Ville). With more than one-fourth of prominent composers clustering in Paris in the 19th century, the city has been globally the predominant location for classical music.

Theatre traditionally has occupied a large place in Parisian culture. This still holds true today; and many of its most popular actors today are also stars of French television. Some of Paris' major theatres include Bobino, Théâtre Mogador, and the Théâtre de la Gaîté-Montparnasse. Some Parisian theatres have also doubled as concert halls. Many of France's greatest musical legends, such as Édith Piaf, Maurice Chevalier, Georges Brassens, and Charles Aznavour, found their fame in Parisian concert halls: Legendary yet still-showing examples of these are Le Lido, Bobino, l'Olympia, la Cigale, and le Splendid.

The Élysée Montmartre, much reduced from its original size, is a concert hall today. The New Morning is one of few Parisian clubs still holding jazz concerts, but the same also specializes in 'indie' music. In more recent times, the  Le Zénith hall in Paris' La Villette quarter and a "parc-Omnisports" stadium in Bercy serve as large-scale rock concert halls.

Films

Parisians tend to share the same movie-going trends as many of the world's global cities, that is to say with a dominance of Hollywood-generated film entertainment. French cinema comes a close second, with major directors (réalisateurs) such as Claude Lelouch, François Truffaut, Jean-Luc Godard, Claude Chabrol, and Luc Besson, and the more slapstick/popular genre with director Claude Zidi as an example.

European and Asian films are also widely shown and appreciated. A specialty of Paris is its very large network of small movie theatres: on a given week, the movie fan has the choice between around 300 old or new movies from all over the world.

Many of Paris' concert/dance halls were transformed into movie theatres when the media became popular from the 1930s. Later, most of the largest cinemas were divided into multiple, smaller rooms: Paris' largest cinema today is by far le Grand Rex theatre with 2,750 seats, whereas other cinemas all have fewer than 1,000 seats. There is now a trend toward modern multiplexes that contain more than 10 or 20 screens.

Fashion

Paris has long been an international hub of fashion design. Paris is the original home of haute couture, and has long set the trends for fashion in Europe; it remains the second largest industry in France, and is heavily regulated and supported by the government "for its economic and tourist value".  The city has produced many notable design houses, such as Chanel, Dior, Yves Saint Laurent, Chloé, Givenchy, Balenciaga, Lanvin, Céline, Hermès, and Louis Vuitton. Paris also remains a premier destination for shopping, with streets such as Rue du Faubourg Saint-Honoré and the Champs-Élysées hosting boutiques from designers around the world. The city is generally considered to be part of the "big four" global fashion capitals, alongside Milan, London and New York City, and in 2011, the Global Language Monitor ranked Paris as the world's third top fashion capital.

In addition to fashion and leather goods, Paris is home to a number of well-known jewelers, such as Cartier, Boucheron, Chaumet, and Van Cleef & Arpels. These and other jewelers have their flagships at the famed Place Vendôme.

Perfume and cosmetics are yet another fashion-related enterprise associated with Paris. Coty, Chanel, Helena Rubenstein, L'Oreal, Lancôme, Kérastase, Clarins, Sephora, and many other worldwide brands are based in Paris.  French women are the biggest consumers of these products in the world (spending on average around $290 each year), and France is the world's largest exporter of perfume and cosmetics, a $91 billion per year industry.

Paris is home to a fashion week twice a year, where the city's fashion houses present their collections. Additionally, designers from other countries may present their collections in Paris. Notable examples include Belgian designers Dries van Noten, Martin Margiela, and Ann Demeulemeester; Dutch design duo Viktor & Rolf; and Japanese designers Yohji Yamamoto, Issey Miyake, and Junya Watanabe.

The two major holding companies in contemporary fashion and luxury, Kering and LVMH, are both headquartered in Paris.

Cuisine

Paris' culinary reputation has its basis in the diverse regional origins of its inhabitants. France's regions have produced distinctive cuisines, much like regional varieties of wine. These mingled with Paris' own regional traditions. In its beginnings, Paris' culinary development owed much to the 19th-century organization of a railway system that had Paris as a center, making the capital a focal point for migration from France's many different regions and gastronomical cultures. This reputation continues through today in a cultural diversity that has since spread to a worldwide level thanks to Paris' continued reputation for culinary finesse and further immigration from increasingly distant climes. Immigrants from former colonies have infused French cuisine with their own traditions, originating in South East Asia, North and West Africa.

Parisian restaurants reflect this diversity, with menus carrying traditional regional cuisine, fusions of various culinary influences, or innovating in the leading edge of new techniques, such as molecular gastronomy. Paris' food shops also have a solid reputation for supplying quality specialized culinary products and supplies, reputations that are often built up over generations. These include many shops, such as Androüet,  which sells over 200 varieties of artisanal cheese; Fauchon, a pastry and chocolatier shop; and Hédiard, a seller of spices, preserves and delicatessen foods.

Hotels were another result of widespread travel and tourism, especially Paris' late-19th-century Expositions Universelles (World's Fairs). Of the most luxurious of these, the Hôtel Ritz, appeared in the Place Vendôme from 1898, and the Hôtel de Crillon opened its doors on the north side of the place de la Concorde from 1909. Le Cordon Bleu, a prestigious culinary and hospitality training institution, opened in Paris in 1895, and now has 35 schools located around the world.

Recreation
Disneyland Resort Paris is a major tourist attraction not only for visitors to Paris but for visitors to the rest of Europe as well, with 14.5  million visitors in 2007.

The Parc Astérix is the other major amusement park located around Paris.

Festivals and events

Paris' annual Bastille Day celebrations take place on 14 July. Along with this national celebration, Paris has a number of other Summer events. Paris Plage is an annual tradition since 2002, seeing three beaches, complete with sand and a theme, built along the Seine. The open-air cinema at the Parc de la Villette is a hugely popular event with Parisians. The Bois de Boulogne city park also features outdoor theatre performances at its Jardin Shakespeare (Shakespeare garden).

Several yearly festivals take place in Paris, such as Rock en the Seine, a celebration of rock and pop music. The Paris Jazz Festival centers on concerts at the Bois de Vincennes park in the eastern part of the city. The Paris Summer Arts Festival brings free music, dance, art, and other cultural events to the streets of the city. La Goutte d'Or en Fête held the first week of July, is a rap and reggae music festival. Every September, a Techno Parade takes place from Place de la République to Pelouse de Reuilly.

Film festivals held in Paris take place in the Fall, and include the Festival Paris Cinéma, Festival de Films des Femmes (Women's Film Festival), as well as the Festival du Film de Paris. Nuit Blanche (White Night), a celebration of art, food, and culture, takes place overnight as an annual event in October, the same month as the Paris Motor Show. Also held in October is the Foire Internationale d'art contemporain (International Contemporary Art Fair), or FIAC. The Fête des Vendanges de Montmartre, celebrating the wine harvest, takes place at the Montmartre vineyards in early October. The International Dance Festival is also an October event. Mois de la Photo is a month-long series of photography exhibits around the city every November. Fête du Beaujolais Nouveau, celebrating the new annual wine vintage, is on the third Thursday of November.

Winter has its share of popular annual traditions, including Christmas celebrations; La Grand Parade to celebrate New Year's Day; the Chinese New Year, celebrated in the 13th arrondissement. February is the traditional Paris Carnival, whose history stretches back to the Middle Ages. Late February or early March sees Paris hosting the annual Paris International Agricultural Show. March is enlivened with the Foire de Paris, celebrating food and wine around the city. The Foire du Trone tradition of outdoor fairs comes to the city in April.

In June, St. John's Day (Feux de la Saint-Jean) is celebrated at Parc de la Villette, and Foire St-Germain brings poetry performances and music to the city. The Paris Street Music Festival is held every 21 June, while the annual Gay Pride Day is 24 June.

The Biennale de Paris, founded in 1959, supports the work of contemporary artists and cultural critics.

Sports and athletics

Sports events that take place annually include several types of sport. The Paris Marathon, along with the London Marathon and the Berlin Marathon, is one of Europe's most popular, and is held each April. The French Open of Tennis is held at the end of May and beginning of June at Stade Roland Garros. The most popular event in horse racing in France is the Grand Prix de l'Arc de Triomphe, held every October at Longchamp at the Bois de Boulogne. The Tour de France concludes each Summer as cyclists reach the finish line on the Champs-Elysees.

Professional Clubs

Notes and references

Bibliography 
 
 
 
 

Time Out Guides Ltd, (2005), Time Out Paris, Time Out Guides,

External links

 Paris Nightlife
 Paris Nightlife 

 
French culture